Mudabbir Hossain Chowdhury psc is a Bangladeshi police officer who served as the 18th Inspector General of Police of Bangladesh Police during 2001–2003.

Career
Chowdhury was a cadet at the Pakistan Military Academy and retired from the army as a lieutenant. After he had served as the IGP of Bangladesh, he was appointed as the secretary of the culture ministry.

From November 2006 to January 2007, Chowdhury was the Election Commissioner of Bangladesh. After leaving his post he attempted to contest the parliamentary elections as a Bangladesh Nationalist Party candidate.

References

Living people
Inspectors General of Police (Bangladesh)
Pakistan Army officers
Bangladeshi civil servants
Date of birth missing (living people)
Place of birth missing (living people)
Year of birth missing (living people)
Election Commissioners of Bangladesh
Bangladesh Nationalist Party politicians